Sharon Horne (born c. 1943) (also known as Sharon Clarke-Horne) is a Canadian curler currently living in Halifax, Nova Scotia.

Awards
STOH All-Star Team: .

Teams

References

External links
 
 Sharon Horne – Curling Canada Stats Archive

1940s births
Living people
Canadian women curlers
Curlers from Nova Scotia
Canadian women's curling champions
Curlers from Prince Edward Island
People from Tignish, Prince Edward Island
Sportspeople from Halifax, Nova Scotia
20th-century Canadian women